Herman Johnson III (born January 29, 1985) is a former American football guard. He was drafted by the Arizona Cardinals in the fifth round of the 2009 NFL Draft. He played college football at LSU.

Early years
At birth, Johnson weighed 15 pounds and 14 ounces, making him the largest baby ever born in the state of Louisiana.

Johnson attended Denton High School in Denton, Texas. As a senior, he allegedly did not allow an entire sack the whole season. He played in the U.S. Army All-American Bowl in 2003.

Considered a four-star recruit by Rivals.com, Johnson was listed as the No. 3 offensive tackle prospect in the nation.

College career
Johnson played college football at Louisiana State University from 2004 to 2008. He finished his career starting 38 of 52 games for the Tigers and was a member of their 2007 national championship team.

Professional career

Arizona Cardinals
Johnson was drafted by the Arizona Cardinals in the fifth round of the 2009 NFL Draft. According to The Sporting News, Johnson was regarded as "somewhat of a 'tweener because he is almost too tall to play guard in most teams' schemes, but at the same time he lacks the athleticism to play tackle effectively in the NFL."

On September 3, 2010, Johnson was cut from the Arizona Cardinals in order to make the 53 man limit for the 2011 season. He was later placed on the team's practice squad.

Chicago Bears
He signed a two-year deal with the Chicago Bears on December 7, 2010. He was waived by Chicago on July 30, 2011.

References

External links
LSU Tigers bio
Arizona Cardinals bio
Chicago Bears bio

1985 births
Living people
American football offensive guards
LSU Tigers football players
Arizona Cardinals players
Chicago Bears players
Players of American football from Louisiana
People from Monroe, Louisiana